Cooper Patrick Marody (born December 20, 1996) is an American professional ice hockey player who is currently playing for the Lehigh Valley Phantoms in the American Hockey League (AHL) while under contract to the Philadelphia Flyers of the National Hockey League (NHL). Marody was drafted 158th overall by the Flyers in the 2015 NHL Entry Draft.

Early life
Marody was born on December 20, 1996 to Patrick and Lisa Marody. He attended St. Patrick School in Brighton before attending St. Mary's Prep in Orchard Lake Village for two years. During his freshman year he played for the junior varsity team, before being promoted to the varsity team later in the season. During his sophomore year, he was named to the 2012–13 MHSHCA First Team All State.

Playing career

Junior
Marody was drafted 130th overall by the Green Bay Gamblers in the 2013 United States Hockey League (USHL) draft, however he was never signed by the team. He attended an open tryout camp for the Muskegon Lumberjacks, and signed with the team as a free agent. During the 2013–14 season, Marody recorded nine goals and 21 assists in 58 games for the Lumberjacks. During the 2014–15 season, Marody began the season with the Lumberjacks, where he recorded two goals and seven assists in 14 games. On December 4, 2014, he was traded to the Sioux Falls Stampede in exchange for Will Graber. In 38 regular season games for the Stampede, he recorded 20 goals and 29 assists. During the 2015 Clark Cup playoffs he recorded one goal and 11 assists in 12 games, to help lead the Stampede to the Clark Cup.

College
Marody began his collegiate for the Michigan Wolverines during the 2015–16 season. He recorded his first career goal and assist in his debut on October 16, 2015, against Mercyhurst. In his freshman season he recorded 10 goals and 14 assists in 32 games. He missed over a month of action after suffering with mononucleosis. During the 2016–17 season, Marody recorded five goals and ten assists in 18 games. He was ruled academically ineligible for the first semester, and returned in time for the 2016 Great Lakes Invitational (GLI). He recorded his first career hat-trick and multi-goal game on February 3, 2017, against Ohio State. Following his outstanding performance, he was named the Big Ten Third Star of the Week for the week ending February 7, 2017, earning his first weekly award.

During the 2017–18 season, Marody was the Big Ten Scoring Champion, recording 16 goals and 35 assists in 40 games. His 51 points led the Big Ten and ranked sixth in the NCAA, while his 35 assists ranked first in the Big Ten and third in the NCAA. He became the third Wolverine to earn the Big Ten scoring title, following Zach Hyman (2015) and Kyle Connor (2016). From October 27 to November 18, he posted an eight-game multi-point streak, registering four goals and 15 assists during that span. He became the first Wolverines player to record multiple points in eight consecutive games since Brian Wiseman during the 1993–94 season. He was named the Big Ten First Star of the Week for the week ending January 3, 2018. He recorded four points, including his second career hat-trick to help Michigan claim third place in the 2018 GLI, and was named to the all-tournament team. He was nominated for the Hobey Baker Award, however he did not finish as a top 10 finalist. Following an outstanding season with the Wolverines, he was named to the All-Big Ten First Team, and was named an AHCA Second Team All-American.

During the 2018 Big Ten men's ice hockey tournament, Marody recorded three assists in the quarterfinals against Wisconsin. During the semifinals against Ohio State he recorded both of Michigan's goals, however the Wolverines lost the game in overtime. During the 2018 NCAA Division I men's ice hockey tournament, Marody scored two goals, including the game-winning goal in the regional semifinals against Northeastern. During the Regional finals against Boston University, Marody scored one goal to help Michigan advance to the Frozen Four for the first time since 2011.

Professional
On March 21, 2018, the Philadelphia Flyers traded the rights to Marody to the Edmonton Oilers in exchange for a third-round pick in the 2019 NHL Entry Draft. On April 8, 2018, Marody signed a three-year, entry-level contract with the Oilers. He was assigned to the Bakersfield Condors, the Oilers' AHL affiliate the next day. On April 11, he made his professional debut in a game against the San Jose Barracuda, where he recorded his first point, with the primary assist on the Condors only goal of the game by Tyler Vesel. On April 12 he recorded his first professional goal against Stephon Williams of the Barracuda. He finished the 2017–18 season with one goal and two assists in three games for the Condors.

Marody was called up to the NHL for the first time on October 21, 2018, as a result of several injuries to the Edmonton Oilers roster. He made his NHL debut on October 23, playing 9:58 minutes of ice time in an overtime loss to the Pittsburgh Penguins. Marody was reassigned to the Condors and later named to the 2019 AHL All-Star Game after leading the team in scoring.

As a free agent from the Oilers, Marody returned to his draft club, after signing a two-year, two-way contract with the Philadelphia Flyers on July 13, 2022.

Personal life
In June 2020, Marody wrote and recorded the song "Agape", for the wife of former teammate Colby Cave.

Career statistics

Awards and honors

References

External links
 

1996 births
Living people
AHCA Division I men's ice hockey All-Americans
American men's ice hockey centers
Bakersfield Condors players
Dornbirn Bulldogs players
Edmonton Oilers players
Lehigh Valley Phantoms players
Ice hockey players from Michigan
Michigan Wolverines men's ice hockey players
Muskegon Lumberjacks players
People from Brighton, Michigan
Philadelphia Flyers draft picks
Sioux Falls Stampede players
Sportspeople from Metro Detroit